Sosa Station is a station on Seoul Subway Line 1 and Seohae Line in Bucheon City, west of Seoul.

History
The station was opened in 1997.

In the future, Sosa is planned to serve several new metro lines; Seohae Line, starting at Wonsi Port (in Ansan City) in the south, through Siheung City, as well as Sosa–Daegok Line going north through Bucheon, Gimpo, and Goyang. These lines would allow connections from Sosa to Line 4 in Ansan, the Sin-Ansan line, Line 1 (at Sosa), Line 7 (in Bucheon), Lines 5 and 9 and AREX (at Gimpo Airport), and Line 3 and the Gyeongui Line (at Daegok Station near Ilsan).

Surroundings 
Seoul Theological University is nearby. Bucheon Bow Museum is located. It provides opportunities for children to experience precious traditional culture by touching and creating bow and arrowheads that were only seen in books.

References

Seoul Metropolitan Subway stations
Metro stations in Bucheon
Railway stations opened in 1997